The Turkey Run Covered Bridge was north of Marshall, Indiana. The single-span Modified Queen Truss covered bridge structure was built by Joseph J. Daniels in 1865, 1866 or 1884, according to several conflicting sources, and dismantled in 1914 by order of the Parke County Commissioners, the abutments remain. It was one of two Queen Truss type covered bridges, the other being the JH Russell Covered Bridge

History
George E. Gould, author of Indiana Covered Bridges Thru the Years, states the Turkey Run Covered Bridge had been built by J. J. Daniels in 1866. However, another source seems to contend that the bridge was built in 1884. A photograph of the bridge clearly shows a Britton Portal with its flat top and corners at 130 degree angles. This could be evidence of a second bridge being built here by J. A. Britton in 1884, or that Britton had made extensive repairs to the bridge at some point.

See also
 Parke County Covered Bridges
 Parke County Covered Bridge Festival

References

 

Former covered bridges in Parke County, Indiana
Bridges completed in 1866
Bridges Built by J. J. Daniels
1866 establishments in Indiana
Wooden bridges in Indiana
Road bridges in Indiana
Queen post truss bridges in the United States